Calyptophilus is a genus of bird formerly placed in the family Thraupidae. The group was found to be distinct enough to be placed in its own family, Calyptophilidae. Established by Charles Barney Cory in 1884, it contains the following species:
 Western chat-tanager, Calyptophilus tertius
 Eastern chat-tanager, Calyptophilus frugivorus

These two species were formerly considered conspecific under C. frugivorus (with the common name of chat tanager).

The name Calyptophilus comes from the Greek words kaluptēs, meaning "hider" (derived from kaluptō, meaning "to cover") and
philos, meaning "loving" (derived from phileō, meaning "to love").

References

 
Higher-level bird taxa restricted to the West Indies
Bird genera
Taxa named by Charles B. Cory
Taxonomy articles created by Polbot